Moskvityanin (Москвитянин, "The Muscovite") was a monthly literary review published by Mikhail Pogodin in Moscow between 1841 and 1856. It was the mouthpiece of the Official Nationality theory espoused by Count Sergey Uvarov. The literary section was edited by Stepan Shevyrev. Gogol's novella Rome was first printed in Moskvityanin, as were many Slavophile papers. In 1850 the magazine was taken over by a young generation of Slavophiles which included Apollon Grigoryev. Their object of adulation was Alexander Ostrovsky. The frequency of the magazine switched from monthly to biweekly in 1849.

References

1841 establishments in the Russian Empire
1856 disestablishments in the Russian Empire
Biweekly magazines
Defunct literary magazines published in Europe
Defunct magazines published in Russia
Magazines established in 1841
Magazines disestablished in 1856
Magazines published in Moscow
Literary magazines published in Russia
Russian-language magazines
Monthly magazines published in Russia